Edwin Thomas (born 1977) is an English historical novelist. He was born in 1977 in Frankfurt, West Germany, and grew up in Belgium and Connecticut, United States. He studied history at Lincoln College, Oxford, where he met his future wife Emma and did significant work in the theatre. He now lives in York with his wife and young son, Owen.

Biography 
After three years working at a local actuarial firm to pay the bills, he decided to start working part-time and focus on writing, He saw an advert for the Debut Dagger competition. He entered it with the first chapter of what became The Blighted Cliffs and finished runner-up. Eventually, he found an agent and a publisher.

He writes naval historical novels about Napoleon wars centered on the eponymous Lieutenant Martin Jerrold. His other series, written under the pseudonym Tom Harper, is centered on the First Crusade. His novel The Book of Secrets interweaves a present-day mystery with a historical account of the inventor of the printing press, Johannes Gutenberg and the artist known as the Master of the Playing Cards.

As well his life as an author, Edwin now spends much of his time as Chair of the successful South Bank Multi Academy Trust of schools in York.

Reluctant Adventures of Lieutenant Martin Jerrold
The Blighted Cliffs (2003) (runner-up of the 2001 Crime Writers' Association "Debut Dagger" Award)
Chains of Albion (2004)
Treason's River (2006)

As Tom Harper

Crusade series
The Mosaic of Shadows (2004)
Knights of the Cross (2005)
Siege of Heaven (2006)

Courtney   
(A series by Wilbur Smith; books with Wilbur Smith)
 15. The Tiger's Prey (2017)
 17. Ghost Fire (2019)
 19. Storm Tide (2022)

Others
 The Lost Temple (2007)
 The Book of Secrets (2009)
 The Lazarus Vault (2010)
 Secrets of the Dead (2012)
 The Orpheus Descent (2013)
 Zodiac Station (2015)
 Black River (2015)

External links
 Author's official website

American historical novelists
Living people
1977 births
Writers of historical fiction set in the Middle Ages
Thomas Edwin
American male novelists